Sphecodes pellucidus  is a Palearctic species of sweat bee.

References

External links
Images representing Sphecodes pellucidus  

Hymenoptera of Europe
Halictidae
Insects described in 1845